There have been several American Express Buildings, named for the American Express company, including:

 Three World Financial Center, New York City (current headquarters)
 65 Broadway, New York City
 647 Fifth Avenue, New York City
 Amex House, the former European headquarters in the Carlton Hill area of Brighton